James William Ronayne (31 March 1877 – 6 August 1936) was an Irish hurler who played for the Cork senior team.

Ronayne joined the team during the 1902 championship and was a regular member of the starting fifteen until his retirement after the 1912 championship. During that time he won one All-Ireland medal and six Munster medals.

At club level Ronayne was a three-time county club championship medal winner with Dungourney.

References

1877 births
1956 deaths
Dungourney hurlers
Cork inter-county hurlers
All-Ireland Senior Hurling Championship winners